Luiz Otávio Alves Marcolino (born 18 March 1997), known as Luiz Otávio,  is a Brazilian professional footballer who plays as a midfielder for Confiança-SE, on loan from Tombense.

Professional career
Luiz Otávio made his professional debut with Botafogo in a 1-1 Campeonato Paranaense tie with Rio Branco on 26 January 2017.

References

External links
 
 Luiz Otávio at playmakerstats.com (English version of ogol.com.br)

1997 births
Living people
Footballers from Curitiba
Brazilian footballers
Association football midfielders
Club Athletico Paranaense players
Paraná Clube players
Santa Cruz Futebol Clube players
Clube de Regatas Brasil players
Tombense Futebol Clube players
Botafogo de Futebol e Regatas players
Barra Futebol Clube players
Associação Desportiva Confiança players
Campeonato Brasileiro Série A players
Campeonato Brasileiro Série B players
Campeonato Brasileiro Série C players
Campeonato Pernambucano players